Nuggets is a 2014 animated short film and YouTube video created by German animation director Andreas Hykade. It was uploaded on 13 October 2014 onto the Filmbilder & Friends YouTube channel.

Production and release
The film was created by Andreas Hykade and funded by the Federal Film Board. Nuggets features a stylised and minimalist animation style. A kiwi, the short's only character, is drawn with black strokes and lines, and is staged on a pure white background, with splashes of goldish yellow being featured in the form of the titular nuggets.

German studio Film Bilder released Nuggets onto their Filmbilder & Friends YouTube channel on 13 October 2014. The video is just over 5 minutes in duration. The video credits Hykade with the film's script, direction, and animation. Angela Steffen worked on the film's animation and artwork. Heiko Maile worked on the film's music and sound design. Additionally, Ralf Bohde, Bianca Just, and Thomas Meyer-Hermann received post-production, production management, and production credits, respectively.

Plot and themes
Nuggets follows a kiwi who encounters nuggets as it walks down a path. As it indulges in a nugget, the kiwi experiences a blissful high, causing the kiwi to feel as if it is flying in the air. The kiwi progressively experiences diminishing returns with each nugget it consumes, with subsequent flights becoming shorter and the falls back down to the ground becoming harsher. As the kiwi struggles with this, the white background also becomes darker and darker.

The short portrays the nugget as a metaphor for some sort of drug, with the story itself functioning as an allegory for the stages of addiction. While there are no explicit references to drugs, some media publications have suggested the short specifically addresses drug addiction, with HuffPost Korea writing that most YouTube viewers also interpreted this meaning.

Reception
The video was covered by media outlets internationally. HuffPost Canada wrote that the kiwi's struggle with addiction was "extraordinarily gripping", opining that "there's something so devastatingly human between the stark black and white lines of German animator Andreas Hykade's five-minute creation." RTBF, a French public broadcasting organisation wrote that the mise-en-scène in Nuggets was "refined". Writing for Fast Company, Joe Berkowitz called Nuggets "a fully realized allegory for addiction", and opined that it "succinctly captures the heartbreaking reality of addiction."

The video achieved virality on YouTube, receiving over 3 million views in a little over a month following its release. By April 2015, it reached over 7 million views. As of December 2021, the video has received over 21 million views. Outside of YouTube, Nuggets was also widely shared on Reddit.

Cancelled sequel
In an April 2015 interview with the German-based newspaper Stuttgarter Nachrichten, Hykade stated that half of a second part to Nuggets was funded. No further developments have been made, however.

Notes

References

External links
 

2014 animated films
2014 short films
2014 films
2014 YouTube videos
Animated films about birds
Animated films without speech
Films about addiction
German animated short films
2010s German films
Films released on YouTube